Bad Vilbel station is located at the 183.6 kilometre mark of the Main-Weser Railway in the town of Bad Vilbel in the German state of Hesse. The Nidder Valley Railway branches from Bad Vilbel via Nidderau to Glauburg-Stockheim.  The station is located in the network of the Rhein-Main-Verkehrsverbund (Rhine-Main Transport Association, RMV). It is classified by Deutsche Bahn as a category 3 station.

History

Bad Vilbel station was opened with the opening of the Frankfurt–Friedberg section of the Main-Weser Railway station on 10 May 1850. The entire length of the Main-Weser Railway from Kassel to Frankfurt was opened to traffic on 15 May 1852.

The section of the Nidder Valley Railway between Vilbel Nord (now called Bad Vilbel) station and Heldenbergen-Windecken (now Nidderau) was opened on 1 June 1907. A new entrance building was built and put into operation for the opening of the new line. It is now protected as a cultural monument under the Hessian Monument Protection Act. Operations on the Nidder Valley Railway on weekends were re-established on 4 May 2008.

The Rhine-Main S-Bahn was opened on 28 May 1978. Since then, Bad Vilbel station has been served by S-Bahn line S6, which has operated  since 1992 on the Friedberg–Bad Vilbel–Frankfurt Hbf (underground)–Frankfurt South route.

Platforms

Bad Vilbel station has an extensive system of tracks. Five platform tracks (four through tracks and a bay platform) are available for passenger traffic. Renovation of the platforms to achieve barrier-free accessibility began in 2012. There are also several tracks without platforms for freight traffic.

 Track 5 is a through track and is located on the eastern island platform next to track 7. This is used for Stadt-Express services on the Nidder Valley Railway and individual services to Nidda. When long-distance services are scheduled towards Gießen on the Main-Weser line, S-Bahn trains wait here to be overtaken.
 Track 6 is a bay platform that runs from the north and ends on the island platform between tracks 5 and 7. Individual services on the Nidder Valley Railway start and end here.
 Track 7 is a through track and is the main platform for services on the Main-Weser Railway to Kassel.
 Track  8 is the main platform for services on the Main-Weser Railway to Frankfurt and shares the western island platform with track 9.
 Track 9 is another through track. It is used as an alternative platform track and for services being overtaken.

The ticket office was closed in late 2003.

Rail services

The journey time to Frankfurt Central Station by S-Bahn is about 20 minutes. In addition, there are Regional-Express (RE) and Stadt-Express (SE) connections to Frankfurt during peak hours and Mittelhessen-Express services every two hours. The journey time to Frankfurt station for regional services is about 15 minutes.

Services on S-Bahn line S6 connect Bad Vilbel during the day at 15-minute intervals to inner Frankfurt and Groß Karben. Every second S-Bahn service from Groß Karben continues to Friedberg station.

Since the modernisation of the Nidder Valley Railway, almost all trains on weekdays and about two-thirds on Saturdays run as Stadt-Express services to/from Frankfurt Central Station. The remaining trains run as Regionalbahn (RB) services, beginning and ending in Bad Vilbel.

In the early evening hours, two trains of the Niddertal-Netz (Nidder Valley Network) run as a combined service of lines SE 32 and SE 34, starting from Frankfurt Hbf, uncoupling in Bad Vilbel. While the front part of the train runs to Glauburg-Stockheim, the rear part continues to Nidda. In the morning peak hour, two trains run from Nidda via Friedberg to Frankfurt Hbf.

Since 13 December 2009, the Mittelhessen-Express stops every two hours in Bad Vilbel. Its trains run from Frankfurt Hbf to Giessen with two sections coupled together as a Stadt-Express service. The sections are uncoupled in Giessen. Then one section runs as an RE service to Treysa and the other section runs to Dillenburg.

Since 11 December 2011, a service of the Main-Sieg-Express, designated as an RE-sprinter service, stops in Bad Vilbel during the morning peak.

Bus

Bad Vilbel is connected by several bus routes to the surrounding cities of Frankfurt, Offenbach am Main, Bad Homburg (Ober-Erlenbach), Karben and Rosbach vor der Höhe. It is also served by five city bus routes.

Future
For many decades it has been planned to add two separate tracks for the S-Bahn to the Main-Weser Railway between Frankfurt and Bad Vilbel, or as far as Friedberg. This is expected to go into operation in 2022 as part of a 10-point program of the Hessian state government to improve transport in Frankfurt Rhine-Main region. Planning permission for the project has already been granted in the Bad Vilbel area.

Photographs

References

External links

Railway stations in Hesse
Rhine-Main S-Bahn stations
Buildings and structures in Wetteraukreis
Railway stations in Germany opened in 1850